Mariem is an Arabic variant of the Aramaic given name Maryam. It may refer to:

Mariem Ben Chaabane (born 1983), Tunisian actress
Mariem Hassan (1958–2015), Sahrawi singer and lyricist
Mariem Homrani (born 1991), Tunisian boxer
Mariem Houij (born 1994), Tunisian footballer
Meriem Sassi (born 1991), Tunisian footballer
Mariem Alaoui Selsouli (born 1984), Moroccan middle- and long-distance runner
Mariem Velazco (born 1998), Venezuelan model and beauty queen

See also
Marieme
Maryam (disambiguation)
Mariam (disambiguation)
Miriam (disambiguation)